Choi Su-bin (born ) is a South Korean female volleyball player. She is part of the South Korea women's national volleyball team.

Career 
She participated in the 2017 FIVB Volleyball Women's World Grand Champions Cup.

Clubs 
  KGC Sports Club, 2017

References

External links 

 FIVB Profile
  Women Volleyball VII Grand Champions Cup 2017 Japan 05-10.09 +9 UTC - Winner China

1994 births
Living people
South Korean women's volleyball players
Sportspeople from Seoul